Prumnopitys ferruginea, commonly called  miro, is an evergreen coniferous tree which is endemic to New Zealand. Before the genus Prumnopitys was distinguished, it was treated in the related genus Podocarpus as Podocarpus ferrugineus.

It grows up to 25 m high, with a trunk up to 1.3 m diameter. The leaves are linear to sickle-shaped, 15–25 mm long and 2–3 mm broad, with downcurved margins. The plants are dioecious with pollen cones being solitary while those of female plants hang from a curved, scaly stalk. The seed cones are highly modified, reduced to a central stem 2–3 cm long bearing 1-3 scales, each scale maturing berry-like, oval, about 20 mm long and 10–15 mm broad, red to purple-red with a soft edible pulp covering the single seed. The seeds are dispersed by the New Zealand pigeon, which eats the very conspicuous 'berries' and passes the seeds in its droppings. It is found growing on both lowland terrain and on hill slopes throughout the two main islands as well as on Stewart Island/Rakiura (47° S). The Tree can live for at least 600 years.

The scientific name ferruginea derives from the rusty colour of dried herbarium specimens of the leaves.

Distinguishing miro from matai
Miro is distinguished from the related, and (initially) very similar looking matai (Prumnopitys taxifolia) in four aspects of its anatomy; its cones, bark, seeds and leaves. 
Miro trees have longer, broader leaves with green undersides while those of matai leaves are white. In addition, the leaves of miro generally narrow to a point, whereas those of matai are rounded, sometimes with a small point right at the very tip. Fine, flat, feathery foliage.
Miro trees have cones of some hue of red in colour while those of matai are blue-black. 
Miro also have relatively longer cones which are oval and red in colour.
Like matai, the bark of more mature miro trees flakes off to leave a distinctive "hammer mark pattern", but unlike matai, the pattern is not as pronounced nor as colourful (areas from which bark flakes have recently fallen in matai often have a striking red colour that fades over time back to brown). these leaves take up to 3 years to decompose.

References

Nature guide to the New Zealand forest, John Dawson and Rob Lucas, Godwit, 2000
The Trees of New Zealand, L. Cockyane, E. Phillips Turner, Government printer, 1943
Trees and shrubs of New Zealand, A.L. Poole and N.M. Adams, Government printer, 1963
Gymnosperm Database: Prumnopitys ferruginea
Photos of tree and foliage with cones

ferruginea
Trees of New Zealand
Trees of mild maritime climate
Least concern plants